William Kostakis (born 2 June 1989) is an Australian author and journalist. In high school, he won the Sydney Morning Herald Young Writer of the Year prize for a short story called 'Bing Me'. He went on to sign his first book deal in his final year of high school. His second novel, The First Third won the 2014 Inky Awards, and was shortlisted for the CBCA Book of the Year: Older Readers and Prime Minister's Literary Awards. His latest novel The Sidekicks was released in 2016, and has since been shortlisted for the Queensland Literary Awards.

Works

Young adult novels 
 Loathing Lola (2008)
 The First Third (2013)
 The Sidekicks (2016)
 Monuments (2019)

Chapter books 
 Stuff Happens: Sean (2014)

Short stories 
 'Bing Me' (The Sydney Morning Herald, 2005)
 'An Alternate Life' (The Star Observer, 2016)
 'The Bounce Back' (The Star Observer, 2016)
 'Hatchet' (The Book That Made Me, 2016)
 'I Can See The Ending' (Begin, End, Begin: A #LoveOzYA Anthology, 2017)

Young adult novels

Loathing Lola (2008) 
His first novel for young adults, Loathing Lola, was released in August 2008 through Pan Macmillan under his birth name William Kostakis. Kostakis scored his first publishing contract at 17, while still completing his final year of high school, Newington College. He began work on a variant of Loathing Lola when he was 11 years old, and has since been refining it. The novel has been a critical success, dubbed a "kickass debut", "a smart, sharp tale about fame, love and loss" by Australian DOLLY Magazine, "brilliant" by The Examiner, "a promising debut from a young and talented Australian writer" by Danielle Trabsky at Australian Book Review, "polished" and "extremely funny" by Mike Shuttleworth at the State Library of Victoria, "highly entertaining" by Angela Meyer at LiteraryMinded, "a witty tale of trust, teenage friendship, school politics, family relationships and teenage love that is propelled by regular humour, satirical characters and loads of drama... a popular addition to the mid-teen market" by Allison Paterson at Magpies Magazine, and rated four stars by Anastasia Gonis at Good Reading Magazine, who said, "The story sparkles through the humorous dialogue of a cast of cleverly chosen characters".

References 

1989 births
People educated at Newington College
21st-century Australian novelists
Australian male novelists
Australian people of Greek descent
Living people
Writers from New South Wales
21st-century Australian male writers
Australian male short story writers
21st-century Australian short story writers
Australian LGBT novelists
Australian gay writers